Paeonius may refer to:
 Paeonius of Mende, 5th century BCE Greek sculptor
 Paeonius of Ephesus, 4th century BCE Greek architect